"Africa" is a song by American rock band Toto, the tenth and final track on their fourth studio album Toto IV (1982). It was released as a single in the US through Columbia Records in October 1982, the album's third single overall and second in Europe. The song was written by band members David Paich and Jeff Porcaro, produced by the band, and mixed by Grammy-winning engineer Elliot Scheiner.

Critics praised its composition and Toto's performances. The song reached number one on the United States' Billboard Hot 100 chart, the band's only Billboard number one, and number one on the Canadian charts. It also peaked in the top ten in the United Kingdom, Ireland, Netherlands, Australia, New Zealand, and Switzerland.

The song was accompanied by a music video, which premiered in 1983, and was directed by Steve Barron, who collaborated previously with the group for "Rosanna". The video features Toto in a library, as they perform and showcase various aspects of African culture. While popular in the 1980s and 1990s, with the song being certified gold by the RIAA in 1991, "Africa" saw a resurgence in popularity via social media during the mid- to late 2010s, inspiring numerous Internet memes as well as a fan-requested cover by American rock band Weezer which peaked at number 51 on the Billboard Hot 100. It has since been certified eight times platinum.

Background
The initial idea and lyrics for the song came from David Paich. Paich was playing around with a new keyboard, the CS-80, and found the brassy sound that became the opening riff. He completed the melody and lyrics for the chorus in about ten minutes, much to Paich's surprise. "I sang the chorus out as you hear it. It was like God channeling it. I thought, 'I'm talented, but I'm not that talented. Something just happened here!'" Paich reckons that he refined the lyrics for six months before showing the song to the rest of the band.

In 2015, Paich explained that the song is about a man's love of a continent, Africa, rather than just a personal romance. He based the lyrics on a late night documentary with depictions of African plight and suffering. The viewing experience made a lasting impact on Paich: "It both moved and appalled me, and the pictures just wouldn't leave my head. I tried to imagine how I'd feel about it if I was there and what I'd do." Jeff Porcaro elaborates further, explaining: "A white boy is trying to write a song on Africa, but since he's never been there, he can only tell what he's seen on TV or remembers in the past."

Some additional lyrics relate to a person flying in to meet a lonely missionary, as Paich described in 2018. As a child, Paich attended a Catholic school; several of his teachers had done missionary work in Africa. Their missionary work became the inspiration behind the line: "I bless the rains down in Africa." Paich, who at the time had never set foot in Africa, based the song's landscape descriptions from an article in National Geographic.

During an appearance on the radio station KROQ-FM, Steve Porcaro and Steve Lukather described the song as "dumb" and "an experiment" and some of the lyrics as "goofy" that were just placeholders, particularly the line about the Serengeti. Engineer Al Schmitt stated that "Africa" was the second song written for Toto IV and had been worked on extensively in the studio. Eventually, the band grew tired of the song and considered cutting it from the album entirely. David Paich considered saving "Africa" for a solo record but decided against it.

Composition
Musically, the song took some time to assemble. Steve Porcaro, the band's synth player, introduced Paich to the Yamaha CS-80, a polyphonic analog synthesizer, and instructed him to write a song specifically with the keyboard in mind. Paich gravitated towards a brassy flute sound, which he found to be a unique alternative to the piano. Porcaro programmed six tracks of a Yamaha GS 1 digital piano to emulate the sound of a kalimba. Each track featured a one-three note gamelan phrase with different musical parameters. Steve Porcaro's brother, Jeff, played his parts live without a click track.

Jeff Porcaro also acknowledged that he was influenced by the sounds created by fellow Los Angeles session musicians Milt Holland and Emil Richards. He also described the significance of the African pavilion drummers at the 1964 New York World's Fair and a National Geographic Special. To recreate those sounds, he and his father Joe Porcaro made percussion loops on bottle caps and marimba respectively. I was about 11 when the New York World's Fair took place, and I went to the African pavilion with my family. I saw the real thing ... It was the first time I witnessed somebody playing one beat and not straying from it, like a religious experience, where it gets loud, and everyone goes into a trance.

Music video
The music video used the radio edit and was directed by Steve Barron. It features Mike Porcaro on bass, replacing David Hungate, who had already left the band before the video was made. Lenny Castro is also featured in the video on percussion. As of late February 2023, the music video has 847.2 million views on YouTube.

In the video, a researcher in a library (portrayed by band member David Paich) tries to match a scrap of a picture of a shield to the book from which it was torn out. As he continues his search, a female librarian working at a nearby desk takes occasional notice of him, while a native carrying a shield that matches the picture begins to close in on the library from the surrounding jungle. When the researcher finds a book titled Africa, the native throws a spear at a bookshelf, toppling stacks of books. Africa falls open to the page from which the scrap was torn, but a lantern lands on it and sets it on fire, after which the librarian's eyeglasses are shown falling to the floor. The scenes are intercut with shots of a spinning globe and the band performing atop a stack of giant hardcover books, in which Africa is the topmost.

Reception
The song was popular upon its release, hitting number one on the Billboard Hot 100 in February 1983, and the song has continued to be a popular soft-rock classic up to the 21st century.  Cash Box called it an "image-filled package of pop exotica with its gently tropical synth and marimba."  Billboard called it an "evocative number" that should return the group to the top 10 on the Billboard Hot 100 after the weaker single "Make Believe". Classic Rock History critic Brian Kachejian rated it as Toto's 5th greatest song.

Legacy
The song has been utilized in many internet memes, has appeared in television shows, such as Stranger Things, Family Guy, Chuck, and South Park, and was used by CBS during their 2013 coverage of the funeral of former South African President Nelson Mandela, albeit not without controversy.<ref>{{cite magazine|url=https://www.rollingstone.com/music/music-features/toto-africa-the-new-anthem-747262/|title=How Toto's 'Africa' Became the New 'Don't Stop Believin|magazine=Rolling Stone|date=October 31, 2018|access-date=November 1, 2018}}</ref> It was also included in the 2002 video game Grand Theft Auto: Vice City as part of the fictional Emotion 98.3 radio station.

In 2012, "Africa" was listed by music magazine NME in 32nd place on its list of "50 Most Explosive Choruses." In January 2019, a sound installation was set up in an undisclosed location in the Namib Desert to play the song on a constant loop. The installation is powered by solar batteries, allowing the song to be played indefinitely. Two years later, the song reached 1 billion plays on the streaming site Spotify. In 2021, it was listed at No. 452 on Rolling Stone's "Top 500 Best Songs of All Time".

In 2022, the song was revealed as the third most streamed song of the 1970s, 80s and 90s in the UK (behind Oasis's "Wonderwall" and Queen's "Bohemian Rhapsody").

Personnel
 David Paich – lead and backing vocals, synthesizer, piano
 Bobby Kimball – lead and backing vocals, percussion
 Steve Lukather – electric guitar, backing vocals
 Steve Porcaro – synthesizers
 David Hungate – bass guitar
 Jeff Porcaro – drums, cowbell, gong, additional percussion

Guest musicians
 Lenny Castro – congas, shakers, additional percussion
 Timothy B. Schmit – 12-string acoustic guitar, backing vocals
 Joe Porcaro – percussion, marimba
 Jim Horn – recorders

Charts

Weekly charts

Year-end charts

Certifications and sales

Weezer cover

In December 2017, Twitter user "@WeezerAfrica," run by 14-year-old Cleveland, Ohio resident Mary Klym, tweeted, "@RiversCuomo it's about time you bless the rains down in Africa." The band released a cover of "Rosanna,” a different Toto song (also part of the album Toto IV), in order to troll Klym and those clamoring for a version of "Africa.”

Weezer finally released "Africa" on May 29, 2018. It was the band's first Hot 100 hit since "(If You're Wondering If I Want You To) I Want You To" in 2009. "Africa" reached number 51 on the Hot 100 and peaked at number one on the Billboard Alternative Songs chart in August 2018, becoming the band's first number-one single since "Pork and Beans" in 2008.

Weezer included the cover on their surprise release of the all-covers "Teal Album" in January 2019.

See also
 List of best-selling singles in Australia
 List of RPM number-one singles of 1983
 List of Billboard Hot 100 number-one singles of 1983
 "Africa" (Karl Wolf song)

References

Further reading
 Jeff Porcaro reminisces about how the song's percussion tracks took shape at Mix''

External links
 [ Billboard Chart Listing - Allmusic.com]
 

1981 songs
1982 singles
Atlantic Records singles
Billboard Hot 100 number-one singles
Columbia Records singles
Internet memes introduced in 2018
Music videos directed by Steve Barron
RPM Top Singles number-one singles
Songs about Africa
Songs written by David Paich
Songs written by Jeff Porcaro
Toto (band) songs